Lam ploen (or lam pleun) is a genre of Laotian music, deriving from Iser theater traditions. Since the 1960s and 1970s, lam ploen has become increasingly popular as a song genre, divorced from the theater and with the influence of luk thung singing styles.

References
 Terry E. Miller, "Laos, 6:Relationship With Musics of North-East Thailand". The New Grove Dictionary of Music and Musicians. Macmillan, 2001.

Laotian music